Bius is a genus of beetles belonging to the family Tenebrionidae.

Species
The following species are recognised in the genus Bius:
 Bius estriatus
 Bius thoracicus

References

Tenebrionidae